Clutter is a discontinued GObject-based graphics library for creating hardware-accelerated user interfaces. Clutter is an OpenGL-based 'interactive canvas' library and does not contain any graphical control elements. It relies upon OpenGL (1.4+) or OpenGL ES (1.1 or 2.0) for rendering,. It also supports media playback using GStreamer and 2D graphics rendering using Cairo.

Clutter was authored by OpenedHand Ltd, now part of Intel. Clutter is free and open-source software, subject to the requirements of the GNU Lesser General Public License (LGPL), version 2.1.

In February 2022, the development team announced that the project would be discontinued. No more versions will be released and developers using Clutter are encouraged to port their applications to GTK 4 and libadwaita2.

Adoption 
Popular programs that adopt Clutter are GNOME Videos (a.k.a. Totem), GNOME Shell, Pitivi, Cinnamon Desktop and GNOME Ease.

Mx is a widget toolkit based on Clutter originally designed for the graphical shell of Moblin/MeeGo netbook, but evolved into an independent project.

The widget toolkits Netbook Toolkit (nbtk) and Mx are based on Clutter. Often Clutter is seen analogous to GTK but this is inaccurate. Only Clutter together with Mx or Nbtk can match the extent of the GTK. This is also the reason why Clutter is required to be used along with GTK.

Clutter supports multi-touch gestures. 

 Clayland is a Wayland compositor utilizing Clutter.
 Snappy is a lightweight media player based on Clutter and GStreamer.
 Pinpoint is a simple light-weight presentation program.
 GNOME Maps uses ClutterActor
 Proof of concept casual video games PillPopper (a Pac-Man clone) and HappyWombats (an Angry Birds clone) use Clutter.

GTK Scene Graph Kit (GSK) was initially released as part of GTK+ 3.90 in March 2017 and is meant for GTK-based applications that wish to replace Clutter for their UI.

Software architecture

Clutter is a scene graph-based canvas working in retained mode. Every object on the scene is usually a 2D surface inside a 3D space.

Clutter abstracts the native windowing environment behind a backend, which is also responsible for creating the main container for the scene graph; this top level container is called the stage. Items on the stage are called actors.

Instead of operating on matrices, as does OpenGL, the Clutter developer changes properties of each actor. Clutter will then notice the changes, and render the scene accordingly.

Clutter is currently being developed by OpenedHand to provide visually rich graphical user interfaces on desktop and embedded hardware. The main target are media center-like applications, small devices UIs and base drawing API for GL- and GL/ES-based UI toolkits. Clutter uses Pango for text rendering (with a special GL/GLES renderer) and GdkPixbuf for loading images into GL textures. Interaction with other GNOME platform libraries is done through multiple integration libraries, e.g.: clutter-gst (GStreamer), clutter-gtk (for embedding the stage into a GTK application), clutter-cairo (for using cairo to draw into a texture). It's API and ABI are kept stable within micro releases, but can break API during minor releases—until it reaches 1.0, then it will be API and ABI stable until the following major release.

ClutterActor 
ClutterActor is the basic element of Clutter's scene graph, it encapsulates the position, size, and transformations of a node in the graph.
 A ClutterActor can receive and handle input device events, for instance pointer events and key events.
 Animation is a core concept of modern user interfaces; Clutter provides a complete and powerful animation framework that automatically tweens the actor's state without requiring direct, frame by frame manipulation from your application code.

Supported platforms 
Clutter is developed for the X Window System using GLX as well as Wayland using EGL. Clutter can also use the framebuffer. As of release 0.6, native support for Mac OS X has been added. A native Microsoft Windows backend is supported since the 0.8 release and Windows pre-compiled DLLs are available, however, it is possible to build the latest DLL for Windows with MinGW and Bash shell for Windows.

Since version 1.19.4 from June 2014, Clutter's evdev input backend depends on libinput 0.4.0.

Programming language bindings
Clutter is implemented using the C programming language with a design based on the GObject object system. Bindings are available for these languages:

C++ ( Cluttermm)
Perl (Perl-Clutter)
Python (PyClutter)
Haskell
JavaScript (Seed and GJS)
C# (Clutter-sharp (aka Clutter#)) ?
Ruby ?
Vala (Clutter)

Integration libraries 
Clutter can be integrated with other libraries and toolkits, for instance:

 GTK applications can embed Clutter stages using a special widget.
 Clutter applications can embed GTK widgets using the 'client-side windows' feature since GTK+ 2.18.
 Clutter applications can use GStreamer to play videos directly into a Clutter texture actor.
 Clutter applications can use Cairo to draw onto a texture.
 Video Acceleration API

Example 
This example will add a label on the stage (written in C).

// Retrieve the default stage, which will contain all the actors on the scene.
ClutterActor *stage = clutter_stage_get_default;

// Create a new label, using the Sans font 32 pixels high, and with the "Hello, world" text,
// and will place it into the stage.
ClutterActor *label = clutter_text_new_with_text ("Sans 32px", "Hello, world");
clutter_container_add_actor (CLUTTER_CONTAINER (stage), label);

// Position the label at the center of the stage, taking into account the stage and the label size.
float x = (clutter_actor_get_width (stage) - clutter_actor_get_width (label)) / 2;
float y = (clutter_actor_get_height (stage) - clutter_actor_get_height (label)) / 2;
clutter_actor_set_position (label, x, y);

// Show the stage. All actors in Clutter are visible unless explicitly hidden, except for the stage;
// thus showing the stage will
// automatically display all of its visible children.
clutter_actor_show (stage);

Interface builder 
Clutter can build user interfaces using a specialized JSON dialect. The entire scene graph is defined using JSON types and built at run time through the ClutterScript class.

Example 
This definition will create the main window and place a label with the text Hello, world! inside it.

{
    "id": "main-stage",
    "type": "ClutterStage",
    "color": "white",
    "width": 800,
    "height": 600,
    "title": "Script demo",
    "children": [{
        "id": "hello-label",
        "type": "ClutterText",
        "x": 400,
        "y": 300,
        "text": "Hello, world!",
        "color": "black",
        "font-name": "Sans 48px"
    }],
    "signals": [{
        "name": "destroy",
        "handler": "clutter_main_quit"
    }]
}

The definition can be saved into a file or as a string, and loaded using:

ClutterScript *script = clutter_script_new;
GError *error = NULL;
clutter_script_load_from_data (script, description, -1, &error);
if (error)
{
    g_warning ("Unable to load UI description: %s", error->message);
    g_error_free (error);
}
else
{
    GObject *stage;

    clutter_script_connect_signals (script, NULL); /* connect the signal handlers */
    stage = clutter_script_get_object (script, "main-stage"); /* get the "main-stage" object */
    clutter_actor_show (CLUTTER_ACTOR (stage));
}

Animation 
Clutter allows implicit animations of every item on the canvas using special objects called behaviours: each behaviour can be applied to multiple actors, and multiple behaviours can be composed on the same actor. Behaviours handle animations implicitly: the developer specifies the initial and final states, the time (or number of frames) needed to complete the animation, the function of time to be used (linear, sine wave, exponential, etc.), and the behaviour will take care of the tweening. Clutter provides a generic base class for developers to implement custom behaviours, and various simple classes handling simple properties, like opacity, position on the Z axis (depth), position along a path, rotation, etc.

Since Clutter 1.0, it is also possible to create simple, one-off animations using the ClutterAnimation class and the clutter_actor_animate() convenience function. The clutter_actor_animate() function animates an actor properties between their current state and the specified final state.

Example 
This example will scale the label from its size to a factor of 2 in 2 seconds, using a linear function of time and behaviours:

ClutterTimeline *timeline = clutter_timeline_new (2000);
ClutterAlpha *alpha = clutter_alpha_new_full (timeline, CLUTTER_LINEAR);
ClutterBehaviour *behaviour = clutter_behaviour_scale_new (alpha,
                                                           1.0, 1.0, /* initial scaling factors */
                                                           2.0, 2.0  /* final scaling factors */ );
clutter_behaviour_apply (behaviour, label);
These statements will create a timeline with a duration of 2 seconds; an alpha, binding the timeline to a linear easing mode; a behaviour, which will scale any actor to which it is applied between factor 1.0 and factor 2.0 (both horizontally and vertically). Finally, it applies the behaviour to an actor.

The equivalent code using the implicit animations API is:

clutter_actor_animate (label,          /* the actor to animate */
                       CLUTTER_LINEAR, /* the easing mode */
                       2000,           /* the duration of the animation */
                       "scale-x", 2.0, /* final horizontal scaling factor */
                       "scale-y", 2.0, /* final vertical scaling factor */
                       NULL);
This statement will create an implicit ClutterAnimation object, which will animate the provided GObject properties between their current value and the specified final value.

COGL 
Cogl is a small open source software library for using 3D graphics hardware to draw pretty pictures. The API departs from the flat state machine style of OpenGL and is designed to make it easy to write orthogonal components that can render without stepping on each other's toes. Cogl currently supports OpenGL ES 1.1/2.0 and OpenGL > 1.3 (or 1.2 if you have the GL_ARB_multitexture extension), and having Gallium3D or D3D back-ends are options for the future.

libchamplain 
libchamplain is a C library providing a ClutterActor to display maps. It also provides a GTK widget to display maps in GTK applications.
libchamplain is named after Samuel de Champlain, a French navigator, explorer and cartographer.

See also 

 Core Animation – data visualization API used by Mac OS X 10.5 and later
 Qt Quick – a similar application framework based on Qt and QML

References

External links
 Clutter homepage

 
GNOME libraries
Software that uses Cairo (graphics)
GTK
Articles with example C code